Otto Ernst Küstner (26 August 1849, Trossin, Province of Saxony – 12 May 1931) was a German gynecologist.

Initially he studied medicine in Leipzig and Berlin, and during the Franco-Prussian War was a volunteer with the Garde-Füsilier-Regiment. Afterwards, he continued his studies at the University of Halle, obtaining his doctorate in 1873. He then furthered his education in Vienna, later returning to Halle as an assistant in the polyclinic of Theodor Weber and also in the obstetrics institute under Robert Michaelis von Olshausen. 

In 1877 he received his habilitation, and shortly afterwards became an associate professor at the University of Jena (1879). In 1887 he was appointed professor of obstetrics and gynecology in Dorpat, and from 1893 until his retirement in 1923 was a professor at the University of Breslau.

Küstner specialized in operative gynecology and situations involving difficult childbirth. There are a number of medical eponyms associated with him, including an obstetrical extraction hook known as "Küstner's Steißhaken". He was the author of a successful textbook on gynecology, titled "Kurzes Lehrbuch der Gynäkologie" (1901, 9th edition 1922).

Selected written works 
 Der abdominale Kaiserschnitt (The abdominal Caesarean section), Wiesbaden (1915).
 Kurzes Lehrbuch der Gynäkologie (Short textbook of gynecology), Jena (9th edition 1922). 
 Pathologie der Schwangerschaft (Pathology of pregnancy), in: K. Baisel's Textbook of Obstetrics, Volume 2, (1924).

References 
 Parts of this article are based on a translation of the equivalent article at the German Wikipedia, whose references include: Biography of Otto Küstner @ NDB/ADB Deutsche Biographie.
 Catalogus-professorum-halensis (translated biography)

1849 births
1931 deaths
People from Nordsachsen
People from the Province of Saxony
German gynaecologists
Leipzig University alumni
Academic staff of the University of Breslau
Academic staff of the University of Tartu
Academic staff of the University of Jena